Louis James Almond (born 5 January 1992) is an English semi-professional footballer who plays as a forward for Ashton United. He has played in the Football League for Cheltenham Town and Blackpool.

Career

Blackpool and loans
Almond was born in Blackburn, Lancashire. He attended Darwen Vale High School and played for the successful team that over the years represented Lancashire in the county cup, and also represented them in Sweden in the year 2000 (aged 8). Almond was at hometown club Blackburn Rovers Academy before joining Blackpool.

Whilst still a member of the Blackpool youth team, Almond became a regular in the club's reserve team in the 2008–09 season. In July 2009, he played for the first team in the pre-season South West Challenge Cup held in North Devon, including playing in the 5–0 win over Barnstaple Town.

Then, still a second-year scholar, Almond made his first-team debut for Blackpool as a 70th-minute substitute in a 2–1 win over Crewe Alexandra at Gresty Road in the first round of the 2009–10 League Cup on 11 August 2009. On 19 March 2010, he joined League Two club Cheltenham Town on loan, making his debut the following day in a 1–1 draw with Port Vale at Whaddon Road.

He went back out on loan on 1 January 2011, to Conference Premier club Barrow, for one month. He scored on his debut, giving him four goals in as many matches. On 31 January 2011, he extended his loan spell at the club until 3 April. Almond returned to Barrow on loan in time for 2011–12, in a deal which allowed him to continue playing in Blackpool reserve matches where possible. The loan deal lasted until January 2012, when he returned to Blackpool, having scored one goal in 26 appearances for Barrow.

On 31 January 2012, Almond joined Conference Premier club Lincoln City on loan until the end of 2011–12. He made five appearances, scoring one goal. On 6 June 2012, he signed a new one-year contract with Blackpool, with an option for a further year.

On 9 August 2013, Almond rejoined Hyde on a season-long loan. The loan lasted until 31 January 2014 when new caretaker manager Barry Ferguson recalled Almond to Bloomfield Road after scoring 4 goals in 29 appearances for bottom placed Hyde. Almond made Blackpool's first-team squad in mid April 2014 and made his Blackpool League debut coming on as substitute for David Goodwillie in a Lancashire derby against Burnley.

Hyde
After his release from Blackpool, he joined Conference North club Hyde in August 2014.

Southport
On 2 February 2015, Almond signed for Southport following his release from Hyde. He made his debut in a 5–3 defeat against Forest Green Rovers. He scored his first goal and only goal of 2014–15 Southport five matches after his debut in a 2–2 draw against Grimsby Town. Southport finished 19th that season. In the following season, Almond was a regular for Southport, making 46 appearances scoring 13 goals.

Tranmere Rovers
On 20 September 2016, Almond signed for Southport's National League rivals Tranmere Rovers for an undisclosed fee. On 23 February 2017, Almond rejoined Southport on loan, with his chances in the Tranmere team limited.

York City
Almond signed for newly relegated National League North club York City on 30 June 2017 on a one-year contract.

Chorley
Almond signed for National League North club Chorley on 5 June 2018. He left the club by mutual consent after he was restricted to four appearances in the 2019–20 season through injury.

Ashton United
On 10 January 2020, Almond moved to Ashton United.

Career statistics

Honours
Chorley
National League North play-offs: 2019

References

External links

1992 births
Living people
Footballers from Blackburn
English footballers
Association football forwards
Blackpool F.C. players
Cheltenham Town F.C. players
Barrow A.F.C. players
Lincoln City F.C. players
Hyde United F.C. players
Southport F.C. players
Tranmere Rovers F.C. players
York City F.C. players
Chorley F.C. players
Ashton United F.C. players
English Football League players
National League (English football) players